Two ships of the Ministry of War Transport were named Empire Commerce.

Ship names